Desmethoxyfallypride is a moderate affinity dopamine D2 receptor/D3 receptor antagonist used in medical research, usually in the form of the radiopharmaceuticals desmethoxyfallypride or DMFP(18F) and has been used in human studies as a positron emission tomography (PET) radiotracer.

References

External links 
ChemSpider

Typical antipsychotics
Salicylamide ethers
Pyrrolidines
D2 antagonists
Organofluorides
Radiopharmaceuticals
Allyl compounds